The Australia women's cricket team toured England in June and July 2019 to play the England women's cricket team to contest the Women's Ashes. The tour consisted of three Women's One Day Internationals (WODIs), one Women's Test match and three Women's Twenty20 Internationals (WT20Is). A points-based system was used across all three formats of the tour. The Women's Ashes were held by Australia prior to the start of the series.

Australia women won the WODI series 3–0, therefore taking a 6–0 lead in the points-based system. The one-off Test match was drawn, giving Australia an unassailable 8–2 lead in the series, and therefore the team retained the Women's Ashes. Following the conclusion of the one-off Test, the question was raised about whether Women's Test matches should be played across five days, instead of four.

During the second WT20I match, Australia's Ellyse Perry became the first player, male or female, to score 1,000 runs and take 100 wickets in Twenty20 International cricket. She scored her 1,000th run in the match, after taking her 100th wicket in the final of the 2018 ICC Women's World Twenty20 tournament in November 2018, also against England.

Australia won the WT20I series 2–1, therefore retained the Ashes 12–4 in the points-based system.

Squads

Sophie Molineux was added to Australia's squad for the one-off Test match and the WT20Is, after she had recovered from a shoulder injury. Ahead of the WT20I series, Jenny Gunn was ruled out of England's squad due to a side strain. Sarah Taylor withdrew herself from England's WT20I squad, due to mental health issues. She was replaced by Fran Wilson.

Tour matches

50-over match: England Academy v Australia

50-over match: England Academy v Australia

50-over match: England v Australia A

Three-day match: England Academy v Australia

Three-day match: England v Australia A

WODI series

1st WODI

2nd WODI

3rd WODI

Only Test

WT20I series

1st WT20I

2nd WT20I

3rd WT20I

References

External links
 Series home at ESPN Cricinfo

Women's cricket tours of England
2019 in Australian cricket
2019 in English cricket
International cricket competitions in 2019
England 2019
cricket
2019 in women's cricket
The Women's Ashes